Marianna Maslennikova (born 17 May 1961) is a Russian female former track and field athlete who competed in the heptathlon for the Soviet Union. She placed fifth at the European Athletics Championships and Goodwill Games in 1986. A bronze medal followed at the European Cup Combined Events in 1987 and she was the seventh-place finisher at the 1987 World Championships in Athletics. He highest international ranking was sixth with 6456 points in the 1987 season. Her personal best score was 6474 points, set in 1988.

International competitions

References

External links

Living people
1961 births
Soviet heptathletes
Russian heptathletes
World Athletics Championships athletes for the Soviet Union
Competitors at the 1986 Goodwill Games